Baresd is the Hungarian name for two villages in Romania:

 Bărăştii Iliei village, Brănișca Commune, Hunedoara County
 Bărăştii Haţegului village, Sântămăria-Orlea Commune, Hunedoara County